The 2018 Atlantic Hockey Tournament is the 14th Atlantic Hockey Tournament. It was played between March 2 and March 17, 2018 at home campus locations and at the Blue Cross Arena in Rochester, New York. It was the last tournament at Blue Cross Arena before the tournament moved to HarborCenter in Buffalo, New York. By winning the tournament, Air Force earned Atlantic Hockey's automatic bid to the 2018 NCAA Division I Men's Ice Hockey Tournament.

Format
The tournament features four rounds of play. In the first round the sixth and eleventh, seventh and tenth, and eighth and ninth seeds, as determined by the conference regular-season standings, will play a best-of-three series with the winners advancing to the quarterfinals. The top five teams from the conference regular-season standings receive a bye to the quarterfinals. There, the first seed and lowest-ranked first-round winner, the second seed and second-highest-ranked first-round winner, the third seed and highest-ranked first-round winner, and the fourth seed and the fifth seed will play a best-of-three series, with the winners advancing to the semifinals. In the semifinals, the highest and lowest seeds and second-highest and second-lowest remaining seeds will play a single game each, with the winners advancing to the championship game. The tournament champion will receive an automatic bid to the 2018 NCAA Division I Men's Ice Hockey Tournament.

Standings
Note: GP = Games played; W = Wins; L = Losses; T = Ties; PTS = Points; GF = Goals For; GA = Goals Against

Bracket

Note: * denotes overtime period(s)

Results

First round

(6) RIT vs. (11) Sacred Heart

(7) Robert Morris vs. (10) Bentley

(8) American International vs. (9) Niagara

Quarterfinals

(1) Mercyhurst vs. (11) Sacred Heart

(2) Canisius vs. (8) American International

(3) Holy Cross vs. (7) Robert Morris

(4) Army vs. (5) Air Force

Semifinals

(1) Mercyhurst vs. (7) Robert Morris

(2) Canisius vs. (5) Air Force

Championship

(5) Air Force vs. (7) Robert Morris

Tournament awards

All-Tournament Team
G Billy Christopoulos* (Air Force)
D Zack Mirageas (Air Force)
D Jonathan Kopacka (Air Force)
F Kyle Haak (Air Force)
F Jordan Himley (Air Force)
F Brady Ferguson (Robert Morris)
* Most Valuable Player(s)

References

Atlantic Hockey Tournament
 Atlantic Hockey Tournament